Bielsk  is a village in Płock County, Masovian Voivodeship, in east-central Poland. It is the seat of the gmina (administrative district) called Gmina Bielsk.

The village has a population of 2,600.

References

External links
 Jewish Community in Bielsk on Virtual Shtetl

Villages in Płock County
Płock Governorate
Warsaw Voivodeship (1919–1939)